Cook Glacier is a glacier which flows in a north-northeasterly direction to Saint Andrews Bay on the north coast of South Georgia. It was named by the German group of the International Polar Year Investigations based at nearby Moltke Harbour in 1882–83, for Captain James Cook.

See also
 List of glaciers in the Antarctic
 Glaciology

References

 

Glaciers of South Georgia